Canama is a genus of spiders in the jumping spider family, Salticidae. Its five described species occur from Borneo to Queensland.

This genus is very similar to Bathippus.

Description
The longish abdomen is clothed in white hairs with red streaks and bands. Males have very large, long chelicerae which diverge and project forwards. The long, spiny legs are dark with pale tarsi and metatarsi.

Species
 Canama dorcas (Thorell, 1881) – Moluccas
 Canama forceps (Doleschall, 1859) – New Guinea
 Canama hinnulea (Thorell, 1881) – Queensland
 Canama inquirenda Strand, 1911 – Kei Islands
 Canama lacerans (Thorell, 1881) – Malaysia
 Canama rutila Peckham & Peckham, 1907 – Borneo

Footnotes

References
  (2000): An Introduction to the Spiders of South East Asia. Malaysian Nature Society, Kuala Lumpur.
  (2009): The world spider catalog, version 9.5. American Museum of Natural History.

Salticidae genera
Spiders of Oceania
Salticidae